Moskovsky is a rural locality (a settlement) in Pochepsky District, Bryansk Oblast, Russia. The population was 698 as of 2010. There is 1 street.

References 

Rural localities in Pochepsky District